Creponne is a traditional Algerian lemon sorbet that originates from Oran, Algeria.

This Algerian specialty is white colored.

See also
• Algerian cuisine

References

Algerian cuisine